Wes Bautovich is a former American football quarterback and strong safety for Texas A&M University-Kingsville and Texas A&M University. He played briefly for the National Football League's New York Jets.

High school years
Bautovich attended Kennedale High School in Kennedale, Texas and was a letterman in football and baseball. In football, as a senior, he was named as the District's Offensive MVP.

College
Bautovich signed with Texas A&M University–Kingsville and was a redshirt during the 1997 season. Bautovich was the Javelina's starting quarterback in 1998 and completed 53-of-118 passes for 754 yards and eight touchdowns. He also rushed for 366 yards and scored six touchdowns on the ground.

In 1999, Bautovich enrolled at Texas A&M and joined the team as a walk-on, serving as a scout team quarterback for that season. With the Aggies deep at quarterback but thin at safety, A&M coaches approached Bautovich about moving to the defensive side of the ball during spring practice in 2000. 

Bautovich made an immediate impact playing in the season-opener at Notre Dame and then made two starts against Wyoming and UTEP in place of injured free safety Michael Jameson. Overall, he played in every game and made three starts in 2000, recording 45 tackles—eighth best on the team—and breaking up seven passes. During the 2000 season, Bautovich was also awarded a scholarship.

In 2001, Bautovich also received considerable playing time, including a career-best 18 tackles against Kansas State. In total, he tallied 104 tackles, two interceptions and 10 passes defensed in two seasons for the Aggies.

Professional
Although Bautovich went undrafted, he played in the preseason with the New York Jets, even returning a Carson Palmer interception 78 yards for a touchdown. Bautovich was cut by the Jets who allocated him to the Rhein Fire of NFL Europa, where he played linebacker and recorded 15 tackles and a forced fumble. On January 26, 2008, he was drafted in the 12th round by Team Texas in the AAFL draft, but the season was ultimately canceled.

External links
 12th Man Magazine
 NFL Europa

1979 births
American football quarterbacks
American football safeties
Living people
New York Jets players
People from Tarrant County, Texas
Rhein Fire players
Texas A&M Aggies football players
Texas A&M–Kingsville Javelinas football players
Sportspeople from the Dallas–Fort Worth metroplex
Players of American football from Texas
Expatriate players of American football
American expatriate sportspeople in Germany